Route 10 may refer to:
 One of several highways - see List of highways numbered 10
 One of several public transport routes - see List of public transport routes numbered 10